D Tour: A Tenacious Documentary is a 2008 documentary film directed by Jeremy Konner. It was premiered at the 2008 Santa Barbara film festival on January 31, 2008. The film focuses on the tour Tenacious D made in support of the film and soundtrack of Tenacious D in The Pick of Destiny and the consequences of their film's poor showing at the box office. The film has been released on DVD and Blu-ray in The Complete Masterworks Part 2, which also contains a full live show.

References

External links
Review by Ain't It Cool News
Review by D.J. Palladino of the Santa Barbara Independent
 

2008 films
American documentary films
Rockumentaries
2008 documentary films
2000s English-language films
2000s American films